Calytrix brownii, commonly known as the white turkeybush, is a species of plant in the myrtle family Myrtaceae that is endemic to Western Australia.

It blooms between March to August producing white-cream-yellow flowers

Found along watercourses, on sandstone outcrops and plateaus in the Kimberley region of Western Australia, the Northern Territory and north western Queensland where it grows on skeletal sandy to loamy soils over granite, quartzite or basalt.

Initially described as Calycothrix brownii by botanist Johannes Conrad Schauer in 1843 in the work Monographia Myrtacearum Xerocarpicarum it was reclassified into the genus Calytrix in by Lyndley Craven in 1987 in A taxonomic revision of Calytrix Labill. (Myrtaceae) in the journal Brunonia.

References

Plants described in 1987
brownii
Flora of Western Australia
Flora of the Northern Territory